Papeton, was a coal mining town, now in the area of Venetian Village, a neighborhood in Colorado Springs, Colorado, that is  west southwest of Palmer Park.

Mining

It was a coal mining town, named for Colorado Springs banker and broker John H. Pape, was inhabited by Southern European immigrants, many Italian, who came to Colorado directly after arriving in the United States at the turn of the 20th century. The town was inhabited by individuals who had mined at nearby Curtis, another mining town 1/2 a mile to the north, and moved to the town due to miner's labor issues after they were forcibly removed from their homes by strikebreakers. The 150 men, women and children were led by John Pape. The Curtis mine, established by W.W. Curtis in 1899, was a Cragmor area mine.

The plat for the town was filed on May 13, 1901 in which Pape divided up the land for the town into 180 lots. The town—bounded by the present El Paso Street, Templeton Gap Road, and Fillmore Street—had a steel company, power plant, farms, and a large greenhouse. Its street names were after states, like Virginia and Pennsylvania. Plans for a new two-room schoolhouse were made in 1908. A social program was implemented about 1919 by Professor A. P. R. Drucker and his students from Colorado College for immigrants to teach English, civics, history, and math. Wrestling and boxing classes were also taught as part of the program.

Nick Venetucci worked on the family farm in Papeton, where his Italian-born father was a coal-miner. Nick's brother died in an explosion on the farm. In 1942, 200 people lived in the town.

Templeton Gap Flood
On May 27, 1922, a cloudburst flood, the most severe since 1880, occurred along Templeton Gap, a semi-circular basin surrounded by hills, and through Papeton. Barns, fences, and streets were washed out. Subsequently, there were water development construction projects by the federal government to protect Colorado Springs and Papeton from floods.

Airstrip
An airstrip was built on 320 acres owned by the Colorado Springs Company west of Papeton by Winfield E. Bowersox, who learned to fly and attained his pilot's license in 1913 from the Wright Aviation School. The airstrip was about four blocks from the end  of the street car line. Papeton was adjacent to the Nichols Field in the 1950s.

Venetian Village
In 1954, the Venetian Village subdivision was established between Templeton Gap, Columbine and Hancock Roads with streets named for flowers, like Primrose and Larkspur. It was designed with two churches and a shopping center. The land was purchased from the Venetucci family, who had operated a farm for 33 years and had a house in Papeton. Property values increased 20.85% between 2016 and 2017, increasing from a median value of $130,645 to $158,730.

Annexation
It was one of several small towns—like Ivywild, Pikeview and Roswell—to become part of Colorado Springs.

Notes

References

Further reading

External links

Geography of Colorado Springs, Colorado
History of Colorado Springs, Colorado